The Penske PC-23 was a highly successful CART racing car that competed in the 1994 IndyCar season with Penske Racing, and in the 1995 IndyCar season with Bettenhausen Motorsports. It was designed by Nigel Bennett, who based its design on the 1993 car, the PC-22, which was a radical departure from the basic concept of the previous Penske cars. The PC-23 was one of the most dominant open-wheel race cars ever developed. It won both the 1994 CART season, and the 1994 Indianapolis 500 with Al Unser Jr., together with Emerson Fittipaldi and Paul Tracy scoring 12 wins out of 16 in total, collecting 10 pole positions and 28 podium finishes, in a season that saw Penske also take the Constructor's Cup, and the Manufacturer's Cup with the Ilmor-Mercedes-Benz engine. Nevertheless, the car is mostly known for the controversial pushrod Mercedes-Benz 500I engine, designed and developed for the single race of Indianapolis, exploiting a loophole in different technical rules between the Indy 500 and CART sanctioning bodies at that time.

Overview
The PC-23 was a design evolution of its predecessor, the PC-22, which won the 1993 Indianapolis 500, 8 races over the entire season, and missing the 1993 CART title by only 8 points. The only substantial difference of the new car from it were the smaller rear wings on the short ovals, mandatory by rule changes for the 1994 season, and Team Penske put in a lot of test efforts to minimize the effects of these changes. There were also some modifications on the transmission, but the new car was mostly a progression. Plans to fit the PC-23 with an active suspension system were cancelled due to a ban by CART on such technology. The car and the Ilmor engine were ready for testing by mid-December 1993.

The Indy 500 version of the PC-23, showed a much higher engine cover, required because of the new engine. Other modifications included changes to the input gears of the gearbox, to cope with the lower rpm and higher power and torque the pushrod engine provided. However, the two versions of the gearbox were of the same weight, thus causing no shift in the weight balance. The Mercedes-Benz 500I engine was slightly lighter than the Ilmor Indy V-8, although because of its longer inlets the centre of gravity of the entire engine was higher than that of the 500I, thus changing the overall balance of the car a bit. The development and testing of the 500I engine, at that time called Ilmor 265E, took place in the utmost secrecy because there was a possibility of the turbocharger boost level being changed, or the engine being banned by the Indy 500 sanctioning body.

Racing history

The PC23 debuted at 1994 Australian FAI Indycar Grand Prix, noted for the sensational debut win of Reynard chassis, qualifying 3rd with Fittipaldi, 5th with Al Unser Jr., and 6th with Tracy. In the race, which was shortened by 10 laps due to darkness, Fittipaldi scored a 2nd place, while Unser and Tracy retired for electrical problems. At Phoenix, the first oval race of the season, the PC23 scored its first win, with Fittipaldi ahead of Al Unser Jr. The season continued with six wins in a row, three for Unser: Long Beach, Indianapolis and Milwaukee, where Penske Racing scored a remarkable 1-2-3 win with Fittipaldi second and Tracy third, a win for Tracy at Detroit, and two wins for Unser at Portland, another 1-2-3 sweep for Penske, and Cleveland. In Toronto however, Unser's engine blew, while Fittipaldi finished 3rd, and Tracy 5th, ending an astonishing streak of seven wins in a row. In Michigan, the entire Penske pack retired, but for the next two races, Mid-Ohio and New Hampshire, the Penskes scored two 1-2-3 wins in a row, with Unser as the winner on both occasions. Unser won also in Vancouver, completing his second row of 3 back to back wins of the season. The Road America was won by then-rising star Jacques Villeneuve, his first in CART racing, while Unser clinched the championship ahead of Fittipaldi. Two final events of the season, Nazareth and Laguna Seca were won by Paul Tracy. Unser, Fittipaldi, and Tracy ended the season at first three places in season standings respectively.

In the 1995, not counting the brief and unfortunate attempt to qualify at Indy 500 with their year-old car, Penske Racing was running with the new PC-24, although with much less success. However, the Bettenhausen Motorsports team used the PC-23 for almost the entire season, with the Indy 500 and Milwaukee as sole exceptions. Bettenhausen driver Stefan Johansson scored points in eight races and finished 13th place in the final standings, with on third place as its best result. In 1996, the PC-23 had one final run, at the inaugural U.S. 500 with Gary Bettenhausen, who crashed out of the race in lap 89, while in the 21st place.

Mercedes-Benz 500I

Much to the surprise of competitors, media, and fans, Marlboro Team Penske arrived at the Indianapolis Motor Speedway with a brand new, secretly-built 209 cid Mercedes-Benz pushrod engine, which was capable of a reported 1000 horsepower. Despite reliability issues with the engine and handling difficulties with the chassis, the three-car Penske team (Unser, Emerson Fittipaldi and Paul Tracy) dominated most of the month, and nearly the entire race. This engine used a provision in the rules intended for stock block pushrod engines such as the V-6 Buick engines that allowed an extra 650 cm³ and 10 inches (4.9 psi/33.8 kPa) of boost. This extra power (1,024 horsepower, which was up a 150-200 hp advantage over the conventional V-8s.) allowed the Penskes to run significantly faster, giving them the pole and outside front row on the grid for the 78th Indianapolis 500. Al Unser Jr. and Emerson Fittipaldi dominated the race, eventually lapping the field with 16 laps to go in the 200 lap race when Emerson made contact with a wall coming out of Turn 4, giving Al Unser Jr. the lead and win. The only other driver who finished on the lead lap was rookie Jacques Villeneuve.

In the summer and fall of 1993, Ilmor and Penske engaged in a new engine program. Under complete secrecy, a 209-CID purpose-built, pushrod engine was being developed. Mercedes stepped in near the end of development and paid a fee in order to badge the engine as the Mercedes-Benz 500I. The engine was designed to exploit a perceived "loophole" that existed in USAC's rulebook since 1991. While CART sanctioned the rest of the Indycar season, the Indianapolis 500 itself was conducted by USAC under slightly different rules.

In an effort to appeal to smaller engine-building companies, USAC had permitted "stock-block" pushrod engines (generally defined as single non-OHC units fitted with two valves per cylinder actuated by pushrod and rocker arm). The traditional "stock blocks," saw some limited use in the early 1980s, but became mainstream at Indy starting with the introduction of the Buick V-6 Indy engine. Initially, the stock blocks were required to have some production-based parts. However, in 1991, USAC quietly lifted the requirement, and purpose-built pushrod engines were permitted to be designed for racing at the onset. Attempting to create an equivalency formula, both pushrod engine formats were allowed increased displacement (209.3 cid vs. 161.7), and increased turbocharger boost (55 inHG vs. 45 inHG)

Team Penske mated the engine with the in-house Penske chassis, the PC-23. It was introduced to the public in April, just days before opening day at Indy.

Legacy

The car in its Indy 500 version caused a considerable uproar at the Indianapolis Motor Speedway and in the racing world in general. Subsequently, the PC-23 was recognized as one of the triggers of the CART/IRL split,.

In 2014, author Jade Gurss published a book detailing the efforts to create the PC-23.  Called Beast, the book explored what happened in the year leading up to the 1994 Indy-500.

Complete Indy Car World Series results
(key) (Results in bold indicate pole position; results in italics indicate fastest lap) 

 Johansson did qualify a Reynard 94I - Ford XB V8t.
 Only the #89 car results are counted. Fittipaldi run entire season with the PC-24 chassis, scoring 67 points and 11th final place.

Chassis Constructors

References

External links

 An extensive article about Penske PC-23 and the Mercedes-Benz 500I engine, with various informations, specifications and images at forix.autosport.com 
 Specifications at forix.autosport.com 
 Penske PC-23 Ilmor at dlg.speedfreaks.org 
 Penske PC-23 Mercedes-Benz at dlg.speedfreaks.org 
 penskeracing.com 

1995 CART season cars
1996 CART season cars
Indianapolis 500
Team Penske
American Championship racing cars
American open-wheel car racing controversies